In human-computer interaction, low-key feedback is a type of output that takes a background role by being very subtle, sometimes nearly imperceptible. Physical machines often provide rich low-key feedback as a byproduct of their design. In computer software, the low-key feedback usually needs to be designed in.

The benefit of low-key feedback is that it can provide always available indication without cluttering the user interface with explicit indicators such as text labels or indicator lights. The downside of low-key feedback is that it can be too subtle to some users and it often cannot be self-describing to beginners.

For example, a person driving an automobile has several means of being informed about the operation of the engine. In addition to the dashboard lights, the driver also perceives the sound and vibration of the engine. An abnormal sound or vibration alerts the driver that there may be a problem, while a typical sound or vibration assures the driver that everything is going as normal. Making the automobile completely silent might negatively impact the performance of the driver, as he must expend additional effort to stay informed about the operation of vehicle.

Similarly, a computer program that has two modes of operation might employ low-key feedback to keep the user informed about the current mode. If the program had a view mode and an edit mode, background color of the workspace might subtly change from white to pale yellow when switching to edit mode. A web browser application could keep track of the pages the user has visited and alter the colors of links that point to pages the user has already viewed.

See also
 Haptic communication

Human–computer interaction